Trevor Steer (born 11 October 1938) is a former Australian rules footballer who played with Collingwood in the VFL during the 1960s. 

Steer joined Collingwood from University Blacks in 1961 as a tall and reliable defender and played in two Grand Finals for Collingwood (1964 & 1966). He was made vice captain in 1966 and led the team to a Grand Final, which Collingwood lost. It was his last game for the Magpies. His best season came in 1965 when he won the Copeland Trophy for Collingwood's Best and Fairest player.

External links

Old pie treads down memory lane via On Reflection

Collingwood Football Club players
Copeland Trophy winners
University Blacks Football Club players
Australian rules footballers from Victoria (Australia)
1938 births
Living people